Wanling is a town under the administration of Qiongzhong Li and Miao Autonomous County, Hainan, China. , it has three residential neighborhoods and 18 villages under its administration:
Neighborhoods
Wanling 
Wanling Community
Wushi Community

Villages
Wanling Village
Wushi Village
Daping Village
Shuiyang Village
Laihao Village
Lunan Village
Zhonglang Village
Beipai Village
Dadun Village
Gaopo Village
Nanjiu Village
Jiazhang Village
Pozhai Village
Mengtianpo Village
Xinzai Village
Yapo Village
Lingmen Village
Xinpo Village

References 

Township-level divisions of Hainan
Qiongzhong Li and Miao Autonomous County